The 1872 United States presidential election in Alabama took place on November 5, 1872, as part of the 1872 United States presidential election. Voters chose ten representatives, or electors, to the Electoral College, who voted for president and vice president.

Alabama voted for the Republican candidate, Ulysses S. Grant, over Liberal Republican candidate Horace Greeley. Grant won Alabama by a margin of 6.38%.

This was the last time that Alabama voted for a Republican until Barry Goldwater won it in the 1964 presidential election. As of 2020, this is also the last time that a Republican won a majority of the vote in heavily black Macon County, home of Tuskegee Institute, which would become one of the most strongly Democratic counties in the nation in the late 20th and 21st centuries.

Results

See also
United States presidential elections in Alabama

References

Alabama
1872
1872 Alabama elections